Nicola Piantella (born 28 March 2001) is an Italian rugby union player. His usual position is as a Lock and he currently plays for Benetton Rugby and, on loan with Top10 team Mogliano.

Selected for F.I.R. Academy, in the 2020–21 Pro14 season, and under contract with Rovigo Delta, in 2021–22 United Rugby Championship season, he was named as Permit Player for Benetton Rugby. He made his debut in Round 16 of the competition against .

In June 2021 Piantella was named in Italy Under 20 squad for 2021 Six Nations Under 20s Championship''' 
On 26 May 2022, for the match against Netherlands, he was named in the 30-man Emerging Italy squad,  for the 2022 July rugby union tests. On 26 May Piantella was called in Italy A squad for the South African tour in the 2022 mid-year rugby union tests against Namibia and Currie Cup XV team.

References

External links
itsrugby.co.uk Profile
Pro14 Profile
On Rugby Profile

2001 births
Living people
People from Bassano del Grappa
Rugby union locks
Italian rugby union players
Benetton Rugby players
Rugby Rovigo Delta players
Sportspeople from the Province of Vicenza
Mogliano Rugby players